Julien Rantier (born 11 August 1983) is a French footballer who plays for Vigor Carpaneto as a forward.

Career

Youth career
Born in Alès, Gard, Rantier started his professional career at Gard club Nîmes. After played one Ligue 2 games for the club on 7 April 2001, he joined Atalanta reserve team in summer 2001. Rantier played his only Serie A game on 17 May 2003. That match he was one of the starting forwards along with Fausto Rossini. He was replaced by Davor Vugrinec at half time, at that time losing 0–1. The match Atalanta won Como 2–1.

Vicenza
He joined Vicenza in 2003 as Atalanta sold 50% registration rights, which he played 26 Serie B games and scored one goal, impress Vicenza to sign him permanently. But the second season with Vicenza was not successful, which Rantier joined AlbinoLeffe in January 2005.

Verona
In August 2005 he joined Verona in co-ownership deal, for €270,000 on 31 August 2005. The club relegated at the end of season but renewed the co-ownership deal with Vicenza in June but sold its portion to Piacenza Calcio in July. The forward position was replaced by free agent William.

Piacenza
In next season half of Rantier's contractual rights was bought by Piacenza for €500,000 from Verona via Vicenza, which Vicenza received €20,000 of the fee (€500,000 minus €480,000). In June 2007 Piacenza bought him outright for another €500,000. Piacenza raised the fee by selling Daniele Cacia, also a forward. Rantier played 28 Serie B games for Piacenza.

Second spell at Verona
On 2 February 2009 he returned to Verona.

Despite not a regular starter in the league, Rantier played the first two games of 2009–10 Coppa Italia Lega Pro and scored a brace. However, he was replaced by Nicola Ciotola in the third and fourth games.

Taranto
In 2010, he left Verona to join Taranto. Rantier almost played all the 68 league matches for Taranto in 2 seasons but did not play in 2010–11 Coppa Italia Lega Pro nor 2011–12 Coppa Italia Lega Pro. He was suspended twice in 2011–12 season due to his fourth caution and his second caution in 2010–11 promotion play-off.

Perugia
After the bankruptcy of Taranto, he was signed by Perugia. He made over 30 appearances that season, but half of them were substitutes, including all 4 matches in 2012–13 Coppa Italia Lega Pro
.

Alessandria, Pro Piacenza, Bassano Virtus and Südtirol 
On 9 July 2013 he signed a two-year contract with Alessandria; on 19 June 2015 the club announces that the expiring contract of Rantier will not be renewed, leaving him free transfer. At the beginning of July agreeing with the Pro Piacenza where he will play for one season. In the summer of 2016 he joined Bassano Virtus. But in January 2017, he left Bassano to join Südtirol.

Career statistics

References

External links

French footballers
Nîmes Olympique players
Atalanta B.C. players
L.R. Vicenza players
U.C. AlbinoLeffe players
Hellas Verona F.C. players
Piacenza Calcio 1919 players
Taranto F.C. 1927 players
A.C. Perugia Calcio players
Ligue 2 players
Serie A players
Serie B players
Serie C players
French expatriate footballers
Expatriate footballers in Italy
French expatriate sportspeople in Italy
Association football forwards
People from Alès
1983 births
Living people
Sportspeople from Gard
Footballers from Occitania (administrative region)